Barang may refer to:

Barang (Khmer word) ('French')
Barang (magic), a malevolent use of sympathetic magic by Filipino witches
Barang Junction railway station, Cuttack, India
Barang Subdivision, Khyber Pakhtunkhwa, Pakistan
Barang-e Bozorg ('Greater Barang'), a village in Bushehr Province, Iran
Barang-e Kuchak ('Lesser Barang'), a village in Bushehr Province, Iran

See also

Farang
Baran (disambiguation)
Parang (disambiguation)
Barang-Barang language, a variety of Laiyolo